Miloslav Mečíř (born 19 May 1964) is a Slovak former professional tennis player. He won the men's singles gold medal at the 1988 Olympic Games, representing Czechoslovakia, and contested two major singles finals. In 1987 he won the WCT Finals, the season-ending championship for the World Championship Tennis tour. His son Miloslav Jr. is also a former professional tennis player.

Career
Mečíř was born in Bojnice, Czechoslovakia (now part of Slovakia).

He reached two ATP finals in 1984 and began 1985 by beating Jimmy Connors in the semifinal at Philadelphia, before losing to world No. 1 John McEnroe in the final. He won his first ATP singles title in Rotterdam later that year, and ended 1985 ranked just outside the world's top 10.

He consolidated his position as a world class player in 1986, beating rising Stefan Edberg in straight sets at Wimbledon, before losing to defending champion Boris Becker in the quarterfinals. He reached his first Grand Slam final at the US Open later that year, beating Mats Wilander and Boris Becker along the way to the final, where he faced fellow Czechoslovak, defending champion and world No. 1, Ivan Lendl. The 1986 US Open was notable for the fact that four players from Czechoslovakia competed in the two singles finals for men and women – Mečíř and Lendl, Helena Suková and Martina Navratilova. Lendl won the match in straight sets 6–4, 6–2, 6–0. Mečíř's 1986 US Open final appearance was the last major final to see a player still using a wooden racket.

Mečíř improved further in 1987, winning six singles and six doubles titles, notably winning the WCT Finals in Dallas, where he defeated John McEnroe in four sets. He met Lendl again in three high-profile matches that year, winning the final of the Lipton International Players Championships in Key Biscayne, Florida, while Lendl won the final of the German Open in Hamburg and the semifinals of the French Open.

By this time, Mečíř's sedate playing style was known to frustrate a lot of the more-powerful top ranked players. The Swedish players, in particular, were said to dislike playing against him.

Mečíř was on top form at Wimbledon in 1988, where he defeated Mats Wilander in the quarterfinal. It was Wilander's only Grand Slam singles defeat of the year (he won the 1988 Australian Open, French Open and US Open) yet Mečíř beat him in straight sets. He took a two-set lead in the semifinal against Edberg with a similar display, and later led by a break of serve in the final set, but Edberg eventually wore him down on the way to his first Wimbledon crown.

The highlight of Mečíř's career came later in 1988 when he was selected to represent Czechoslovakia in the Seoul Olympics. He defeated Eric Jelen, Jeremy Bates, Guy Forget and Michiel Schapers and then in the men's singles semifinals he exacted revenge over Wimbledon champion Edberg, in a five-set match. He then met Tim Mayotte of the U.S. in the men's singles final and won in four sets 3–6, 6–2, 6–4, 6–2 to claim the gold medal. He also won a bronze medal in the men's doubles, partnering Milan Šrejber.

In 1989, Mečíř reached his second Grand Slam final at the Australian Open in Melbourne. Again he came up against Lendl and lost in straight sets. It was a tactical victory for Lendl, whose win saw him to reclaim the world No. 1 ranking from Wilander. After the match, Lendl apologized to the crowd, explaining that he and coach Tony Roche had decided the best tactic against Mečíř was to hit shots deep and down the centre of the court, denying his opponent the angles he thrived on.

Mečíř was a member of the Czechoslovak teams that won the World Team Cup in 1987 and the inaugural Hopman Cup in 1989. He is currently the Slovak Davis Cup captain.

During his career, Mečíř won 11 singles titles and nine doubles titles. His career-high world ranking in both singles and doubles was world No. 4. His final career singles title came in 1989 at Indian Wells. His last doubles title was also won in 1989 in Rotterdam.

Throughout most of 1989 and into 1990, Mečíř suffered from a worsening back injury and he retired in July 1990, aged just 26.

Playing style

Mečíř was a finesse player whose career straddled the transition from wooden and metal racquets towards modern graphite composites. He was noted for his touch shots as well as the ability to disguise his shots, particularly his two-handed backhand. His court coverage and graceful footwork earned him the nickname "The Big Cat". The French called him "Le Prestidigitateur" (The Conjuror).

Many top players used to cite Mečíř as the one player they most enjoyed watching because of his beautifully simple style and touch. He was known as the "Swede Killer" for the success that he had against Swedish players, especially Mats Wilander.

Major finals

Grand Slam finals

Singles: 2 (0–2)

WCT Year–end championship finals

Singles: 1 (1–0)

Olympic finals

Singles: 1 (1 gold medal)

ATP Career finals

Singles: 24 (11 titles, 13 runner-ups)

Doubles: 12 (9 titles, 3 runner-ups)

Singles performance timelines

Grand Slam tournaments

Grand Prix tournaments

Record against top-10 players

Mečíř's record against those who have been ranked in the top 10, with active players in boldface.

References

External links
 
 
 
 
 
 

1964 births
Living people
Czechoslovak male tennis players
Hopman Cup competitors
Olympic tennis players of Czechoslovakia
Olympic gold medalists for Czechoslovakia
Olympic bronze medalists for Czechoslovakia
Sportspeople from Bojnice
Tennis players from Prague

Slovak male tennis players
Olympic medalists in tennis
Tennis players at the 1988 Summer Olympics
Medalists at the 1988 Summer Olympics